Puza is a surname. Notable people with the surname include:

Adam Puza (born 1951), Polish politician
Martin Puza (born 1970), Austrian footballer

Polish-language surnames